Eugene McMenamin   (1947), is a former Social Democratic and Labour Party (SDLP) politician from Northern Ireland, who was a Member of the Northern Ireland Assembly (MLA) for West Tyrone from 1998 to 2007. 

He stood as an independent candidate for  West Tyrone in the Northern Ireland Assembly elections in 2011, but was not elected.

In June 1998 he was elected to the Northern Ireland Assembly as the first nationalist to be in government from Strabane in over 300 years. 
McMenamin was his party's spokesperson on Culture, Arts and Leisure from 1998 until 2003 and was in approx 2007 the Party Spokesperson on Western Development.

After being elected as Chairman of Strabane District Council in 2002, he was re-elected to the Assembly in November 2003 but lost his seat in 2007.

In the Northern Ireland Assembly, McMenamin has served on numerous Committees:
 Committee on Enterprise, Trade and Investment;
 Committee of the Centre
 Committee on Culture, Arts and Leisure.
 Committee of the Third World.

References

External links
McMenamin's profile on councillor.info
Ni Assembly page

1947 births
Living people
Members of Strabane District Council
Social Democratic and Labour Party MLAs
People from Strabane
Northern Ireland MLAs 1998–2003
Northern Ireland MLAs 2003–2007